The Legend of Atlantis may refer to:
 The Legend of Atlantis (documentary), a 1990s 5-part documentary mini-series
 The Legend of Atlantis (animation), a 2004 children's animation by Golden Films